Bullock Creek is an unincorporated community in York County, in the U.S. state of South Carolina. It is located southwest of York and northeast of Union along the Broad River.

History
A post office called Bullock Creek operated between 1832 and 1930. The community took its name from nearby Bullock Creek.

References

Unincorporated communities in York County, South Carolina
Unincorporated communities in South Carolina